Anand Babla (1954 – December 22, 2008) was a Fijian politician of Indian descent. He was a member of the National Farmers Union and Fiji Labour Party (FLP), holding the Tavua constituency from 1992 to 2006.  in the House of Representatives.  He won the seat in the general elections of 1992, 1994, 1999, 2001 and 2006.

On 19 May 2000, he was among the 43 members of the People's Coalition Government, led by Mahendra Chaudhry, taken hostage by George Speight and his band of rebel Republic of Fiji Military Forces (RFMF) soldiers from the Counter Revolutionary Warfare Unit. He was released on 21 May 2000, after he signed a paper resigning his seat in Parliament.

Babla's political career came to an end with the military coup on 5 December 2006.

Babla died in India on December 22, 2008, following a long illness.  He was survived by his wife and three children.

References 

1954 births
2008 deaths
Fiji Labour Party politicians
Indian members of the House of Representatives (Fiji)
Fijian Hindus
Politicians from Tavua, Fiji
Fijian politicians of Indian descent